

Northbertus was a medieval Bishop of Elmham.

Northbertus was consecrated sometime before 706. He died sometime after 716.

Notes

References

External links
 

Bishops of Elmham